

List of Ambassadors
Source:
Shimon Solomon incumbent Presented cedentials 09.03.2022
Oren Rozenblat 2016 - 
Raphael Singer 2013 - 2016
Irit Savion-Waidergorn 2011 - 2013
Sagi Karni 2008 - 2010
Avraham Benjamin 2005 - 2008
Bahij Mansour 2001 - 2005
Tamar Golan 1995 - 1999

References

Angola
Israel